The Makwe or Macue language, is a close relative of Swahili spoken on the coast of the Cabo Delgado Province of Mozambique, and across the border in Mtwara Region of Tanzania. Although it shares high lexical similarity (60%) with Swahili, it is not intelligible with it, nor with its cousin Mwani. Arends et al. suggest it might turn out to be a Makonde–Swahili mixed language.

A grammar of the Makwe language by Maud Devos was published in 2008.

References

Languages of Mozambique
Swahili language